Plagiotropis may refer to:
 Plagiotropis (planthopper), a genus of planthoppers in the family Delphacidae
 Plagiotropis (alga), a genus of algae in the family Bacillariophyceae
 Plagiotropis, a genus of flowering plant in the family Fabaceae; synonym of  Swainsona

See also 
 Plagiotropism, a tropism at an oblique angle to the direction of the stimulus